Claude Heller Rouassant (born 2 May 1949 in Mexico City) was the Ambassador for Mexico to the United Nations and the Security Council. He has been Mexico's Ambassador to France, Cuba, Austria and Switzerland. He was also ambassador to the Organisation for Economic Co-operation and Development in Paris, and to the Organization of American States in Washington D.C.

He has a bachelor's degree in International Relations from El Colegio de México, and a master's degree in History and International Relations from the Graduate Institute of International Studies in Geneva.

He was married to Rosario Green, Secretary of Foreign Affairs during Zedillo's period, senator and president of the PRI and ambassadress of Mexico.

References
 Permanent Mission of Mexico to the United Nations in New York

El Colegio de México alumni
Living people
Graduate Institute of International and Development Studies alumni
Members of the Sub-Commission on the Promotion and Protection of Human Rights
People from Mexico City
Mexican people of French descent
Mexican people of German descent
Ambassadors of Mexico to France
Permanent Representatives of Mexico to the United Nations
1949 births
Ambassadors of Mexico to Austria
Ambassadors of Mexico to Cuba
Ambassadors of Mexico to Switzerland
Mexican officials of the United Nations